Shchuchye Ozero is a rural locality (a settlement) and the administrative center of Shchuchye Ozerskoye Rural Settlement, Oktyabrsky District, Perm Krai, Russia. The population was 1,652 as of 2010. There are 28 streets.

Geography 
Shchuchye Ozero is located 46 km west of Oktyabrsky (the district's administrative centre) by road. Melnikovsky is the nearest rural locality.

References 

Rural localities in Perm Krai